Aglaoapis is a genus of cuckoo bee belonging to the family Megachilidae.

The genus was first described by P. Cameron in 1901.

Species
 Aglaoapis alata (Michener, 1996)
 Aglaoapis brevipennis Cameron, 1901
 Aglaoapis tridentata (Nylander, 1848)

References

Megachilidae
Hymenoptera genera